Mary Fields ( – December 5, 1914), also known as Stagecoach Mary and Black Mary, was an American mail carrier who was the first Black woman to be employed as a star route postwoman in the United States. 

Fields had the star route contract for the delivery of U.S. mail from Cascade, Montana, to Saint Peter's Mission. She drove the route for two four-year contracts, from 1895 to 1899 and from 1899 to 1903. Author Miantae Metcalf McConnell provided documentation discovered during her research about Mary Fields to the United States Postal Service Archives Historian in 2006. This enabled the USPS to establish Mary Fields' contribution as the first African-American female star route mail carrier in the United States.

Biography

Early life and career 

Fields was born into slavery in Hickman County, Tennessee . After the American Civil War ended in 1865, she was emancipated and found work as a chambermaid on board the Robert E. Lee, a Mississippi River steamboat. There, she encountered Judge Edmund Dunne and ultimately worked in his household as a servant. After Dunne's wife died, he sent Fields and his late wife's five children to live with his sister Mother Mary Amadeus in Toledo, Ohio where she was Mother Superior of an Ursuline convent.

In 1884, Mother Amadeus was sent to Montana Territory to establish a school for Native American girls at St. Peter's Mission, west of Cascade. Learning that Amadeus was stricken with pneumonia, Fields hurried to Montana to nurse her back to health. Amadeus recovered, and Fields stayed at St. Peter's. Fields took on multiple roles regarded as "men's work" at the time such as maintenance, repairs, fetching supplies, laundry, gardening, hauling freight, growing vegetables, tending chickens, and repairing buildings, and eventually became the forewoman.

Native Americans called Fields "White Crow", because "she acts like a white person but has black skin". Life in a convent was placid, but Fields' hearty temperament and habitual profanity made the religious community uncomfortable. In 1894, after several complaints and an incident with a disgruntled male subordinate that involved gunplay, the bishop barred her from the convent. Fields moved to Cascade where she opened a tavern, but profits waned due to allowing the cash-poor to dine free. It closed due to bankruptcy about 10 months later.

Postal service 

By 1895, at sixty years old, Fields secured a job as a Star Route Carrier which used a stagecoach to deliver mail in the unforgiving weather and rocky terrain of Montana, with the help of nearby Ursuline nuns, who relied on Mary for help at their mission. This made her the first African-American woman to work for the U.S. Postal Service. True to her fearless demeanor, she carried multiple firearms, most notably a .38 Smith & Wesson under her apron to protect herself and the mail from wolves, thieves and bandits, driving the route with horses and a mule named Moses. She never missed a day, and her reliability earned her the nickname "Stagecoach Mary" due to her preferred mode of transportation. If the snow was too deep for her horses, Fields delivered the mail on snowshoes, carrying the sacks on her shoulders.

She was not an employee of the United States Post Office Department, which did not hire or employ mail carriers for star routes, but rather awarded star route contracts to persons who proposed the lowest qualified bids. These people, in accordance with the department's application process, posted bonds and sureties to substantiate their ability to finance the route. Once a contract was awarded, the contractor could then drive the route themselves, sublet the route, or hire an experienced driver. Some individuals obtained multiple star route contracts and conducted the operations as a business.

Later life 
She was a respected public figure in Cascade, and the town closed its schools to celebrate her birthday each year. When Montana passed a law forbidding women to enter saloons, the mayor of Cascade granted her an exemption. In 1903, at age 71, Fields retired from star route mail carrier service. The townspeople's adoration for Fields was evident when her home was rebuilt by volunteers after it caught fire in 1912. She continued to babysit many Cascade children and owned and operated a laundry service from her home.

Death 
Fields died in 1914 at Columbus Hospital in Great Falls. Her funeral was one of the largest the town had ever seen. She was buried outside of Cascade.

Personal life 
Fields was Catholic, though she preferred the company (and activities) of local men to the sisters and their religious trappings.

Legacy and representations in popular culture

Films 
 In the documentary South by Northwest, "Homesteaders" (1976), Fields is played by Esther Rolle. 
 In the TV movie The Cherokee Kid (1996), Fields is played by Dawnn Lewis.
 In the TV movie Hannah's Law (2012), she is played by Kimberly Elise.
 In the short Western film, They Die By Dawn (2013), Fields is played by Erykah Badu.
In the film The Harder They Fall (2021), she is played by Zazie Beetz.

Print 
 In 1959, actor and Montana native Gary Cooper wrote an article for EBONY in which he wrote, "Born a slave somewhere in Tennessee, Mary lived to become one of the freest souls ever to draw a breath, or a .38."
 "Stagecoach" Mary Fields, a screenplay by Georgianne Landy-Kordis
 A biography for children, Fearless Mary: The True Adventures of Mary Fields, American Stagecoach Driver by Tami Charles
Stagecoach Mary, a collection of supernatural tales in pulp-fiction style by Jess Nevins
 The Life and Legend of Mary Fields, https://montanawomenshistory.org/the-life-and-legend-of-mary-fields/, Source: Sunny Nash, Mother Amadeus and Stagecoach Mary True West Magazine, 1996, True West Publications, Cave Creek AZ.
A biographical book,  Mary Fields: The Story of Black Mary by James A. Franks. isbn 0-9657173-4-8

Music 
 Fields is the subject of Michael Hearst's song "Stagecoach Mary", as part of his 2015 Extraordinary People project.

Television 
 In the TV AMC series, "Hell On Wheels" (2011–2016), Fields is played by Amber Chardae Robinson, featured in five episodes during 2015–2016, season five.

Places 
 Asteroid 7091 Maryfields, discovered by Kenneth Lawrence and Eleanor Helin at Palomar in 1992, was named in her honor. The official  was published by the Minor Planet Center on 8 November 2019.

References 
 

1830s births
1914 deaths
20th-century American people
19th-century American women
20th-century African-American women
20th-century African-American people
19th-century American slaves
African Americans in the American Old West
Deaths from liver disease
Mail carriers
People from Cascade, Montana
People of the American Old West
People from Hickman County, Tennessee
United States Postal Service people
Year of birth unknown
19th-century African-American women
African-American Catholics
African-American equestrians